The Battle of Belmont was an engagement of the Second Boer War on 23 November 1899, where the British under Lord Methuen assaulted a Boer position on Belmont kopje.

Methuen's three brigades were on their way to raise the Boer siege of Kimberley. A Boer force of about 2,000 men had entrenched on the range of Belmont kopje to delay their advance. Methuen sent the Guards Brigade on a night march to outflank the Boers, but due to faulty maps the Grenadier Guards found themselves in front of the Boer position instead.

The Guards, the 9th Brigade and the Naval Brigade assaulted the Boers over open ground, suffering about 200 casualties. Before the British came to use their bayonets, the Boers retreated by pony and re-formed in another entrenched position at Graspan, where the pattern was repeated with the British suffering another 197 casualties: one sailor reporting that "at 200 yards we fixed bayonets, and we just saw their heels; they didn't wait when they heard the rattle".

Background 
In the first days of the Second Boer War, Boer forces besieged British garrisons at Kimberley and Ladysmith. A 40,000-strong Army Corps under the command of General Sir Redvers Buller was dispatched to South Africa and arrived in early November 1899. To relieve Kimberley and Ladysmith, Buller divided his forces, leading one division in an advance on Ladysmith, while the 1st Division of Lieutenant General Lord Methuen was tasked with breaking the Siege of Kimberley.

Methuen planned to advance along the Western Railway from the Orange River to Kimberley, both in order to remain close to his supply line due to a lack of fresh water in the region and pack animals, and to utilize the railway to evacuate all civilians from Kimberley as ordered by Buller. Expecting little resistance, the march was undertaken without secrecy and no attempt was made to deceive the Boers as to its direction. After the arrival of the Naval Brigade with its 4.7-inch guns, it began on 21 November.

Due to a shortage of cavalry, the British force was unable to conduct effective reconnaissance and thus were unaware of the Boer strength and composition, while the latter were appraised of the exact strength and composition of Methuen's force. As prior reconnaissance had located a Boer position slightly north of the Belmont station,  from the march's starting point at the Orange River station, Methuen anticipated that the first fighting would occur there.

Prelude

As the British force departed Orange River station, the 9th Lancers and Rimington's Guides conducted a reconnaissance from Fincham's Farm of the Belmont area, spotting several hundred Boers climbing up a kopje. The Boer fire ceased after British artillery began shelling them, and the British force bivouacked at midnight, anticipating battle in the morning. Without detailed reconnaissance, Methuen planned to focus the attack on the Boer positions running 100 ft above and to the east of the railroad, parallel to the railway line. These were Table Mountain and Gun Hill to the south. After capturing both positions, the British force would advance to the east against the other Boer line running parallel to the railway, which included Sugar Loaf Hill and Razor Back to the south and Mount Blanc, which, 100 ft higher than Table Mountain, dominated the region.

Comparison of forces

British
The British 1st Division included the Guards Brigade of Major General Sir Henry Edward Colvile with the 3rd Battalion, Grenadiers, the 1st and 2nd Battalions of the Coldstream Guards, and the 1st Battalion, Scots Guards, and the 9th Brigade of Major General Richard Steele Rupert Fetherstonhaugh, with the 1st Battalion, Northumberland Fusiliers, the 2nd Battalion, Northamptonshire Regiment, the 2nd Battalion, King's Own Yorkshire Light Infantry (KOYLI), and half of the 1st Battalion, Loyal North Lancashire Regiment. The two brigades totalled 7,750 infantry.

The British cavalry force numbered a paltry 850 under Colonel Bloomfield Gough, and included the 9th Lancers, two and a half companies of mounted infantry, thirty New South Wales Lancers, and Rimington's Guides. Artillery support was provided by the 18th and 75th Batteries, Royal Artillery. Divisional troops included four companies of Royal Engineers, among other support units.

Boer
The Boer force at Belmont was led by Orange Free State Commandant Jacobus Prinsloo, who had arrived there with 1,500 men on the 20 November to reinforce an original force of 500 men under T. Van der Merwe. After Methuen began the march, Prinsloo posted detachments on the kopjes about the railway line. Prinsloo's force was joined by 800 men under Koos de la Rey on the day of the battle.

Battle

Aftermath
Lord Methuen wrote to his wife after the battle.
"I detest war, people congratulate me; the men seem to look on me like a father, but I detest war the more I see of it.'
Outside his tent he could now hear a "poor fellow groaning and dying, shot through the chest, he is silent now, so perhaps God has released him."
As many historians of the period and since have pointed out, the reason for such great loses were due to lack of mobility and poor intelligence in the field with virtual no detail cartography at the scale needed.

See also
Military history of South Africa

References

Bibliography

External links
British Battle.com

Belmont
Belmont
1899 in the Orange Free State
November 1899 events
Belmont